Baseball at the 1984 Summer Olympics was a demonstration sport. Although single exhibition games had been played in conjunction with five previous Olympics, it was the first time that the sport was officially included in the program, and also the first time that the sport was played in Olympics held in the United States. Eight teams competed in Los Angeles, California, in the tournament. Games were held at Dodger Stadium. Cuba originally qualified but withdrew as a result of the Soviet-led boycott.

Teams

Qualification
  – 1983 Pan American Games seventh place (invited)
  – 1983 Asian Baseball Championship gold medalist
  – 1983 Pan American Games Fourth place - Replaced Cuba
  – 1983 European Baseball Championship gold medalist
  – 1983 Asian Baseball Championship gold medalist  Note: Chinese Taipei defeat Japan in an Asian playoff, but Japan still qualified after the tournament have been expanded.
  – 1982 Amateur World Series gold medalist, also 1983 Asian Baseball Championship gold medalist
  – 1983 Pan American Games silver medalist
  – Host nation, also 1983 Pan American Games bronze medalist

Rosters

Preliminary round
There were two pools for the preliminary round. Teams played each of the three other teams in their division.

White Division

Blue Division

Knockout round

Semifinals
The semifinals pitted the first-place team of each division against the second-place team of the other division.  Thus, the United States (3–0) played against Korea (2–1), which had a tied record with Japan (2–1) but had lost in head-to-head competition against them.  The first-place Japanese played against Chinese Taipei (2–1).

Third-place final
The third-place final pitted the losers of the semifinals against each, with the winner taking third place and the loser taking fourth.

First-place final
Since baseball was a demonstration sport, no official medals were awarded.  The winners of the semifinals played each other for first and second place, with the Japanese team prevailing, 6–3.

References
 
 Official Report . Official Report of the Games of the XXIIIrd Olympiad Los Angeles, 1984.
 1984 Los Angeles Dodgers Media Guide

 
1984 Summer Olympics events
1984
1984 in baseball
Baseball in Los Angeles
Olympic demonstration sports
1984
Men's events at the 1984 Summer Olympics